Liu Yuchen (born 25 July 1995) is a Chinese badminton player. He was the men's doubles World Champion in 2018, two-time Asian Champion in 2017 and 2018, and also a silver medalist at the 2020 Summer Olympics partnered with Li Junhui. Liu was part of the national team that won the 2018 Asian Games, 2018 Thomas Cup, and 2019 Sudirman Cup. Together with Li, he achieved the men's doubles world number 1 in 6 April 2017, and occupied the top ranking for ten weeks.

Personal life 
His sister, Liu Jing, is a swimmer.

Career 

Liu competed at the 2020 Summer Olympics. Partnered with Li Junhui, he won a silver medal in the men's doubles after being defeated by Lee Yang and Wang Chi-lin of Chinese Taipei in the final in straight games, 18–21, 12–21.

In 2022, Liu started a new partnership with Ou Xuanyi. In the Indonesia Open, the duo beat Korea's Choi Sol-gyu and Kim Won-ho to become the first men’s doubles pair from the reserves’ list to win a Super 1000 title. They qualified to compete at the World Tour Finals and emerged victorious after beating Mohammad Ahsan and Hendra Setiawan in the final.

Achievements

Olympic Games 
Men's doubles

BWF World Championships 
Men's doubles

Asian Games 
Men's doubles

Asian Championships 
Men's doubles

BWF World Junior Championships 
Boys' doubles

Mixed doubles

Asian Junior Championships 
Boys' doubles

Mixed doubles

BWF World Tour (6 titles, 6 runners-up) 
The BWF World Tour, which was announced on 19 March 2017, and implemented in 2018, is a series of elite badminton tournaments sanctioned by the Badminton World Federation (BWF). The BWF World Tour is divided into levels of World Tour Finals, Super 1000, Super 750, Super 500, Super 300, and the BWF Tour Super 100.

Men's doubles

BWF Superseries (2 titles, 3 runners-up) 
The BWF Superseries, which was launched on 14 December 2006, and implemented in 2007, was a series of elite badminton tournaments, sanctioned by the Badminton World Federation (BWF). BWF Superseries levels were Superseries and Superseries Premier. A season of Superseries consisted of twelve tournaments around the world that had been introduced since 2011. Successful players were invited to the Superseries Finals, which were held at the end of each year.

Men's doubles

  BWF Superseries Finals tournament
  BWF Superseries Premier tournament
  BWF Superseries tournament

BWF Grand Prix (7 titles, 2 runners-up) 
The BWF Grand Prix had two levels, the Grand Prix and Grand Prix Gold. It was a series of badminton tournaments sanctioned by the Badminton World Federation (BWF) and played between 2007 and 2017.

Men's doubles

Mixed doubles

  BWF Grand Prix Gold tournament
  BWF Grand Prix tournament

BWF International Challenge/Series (3 runners-up) 
Men's doubles

Mixed doubles

  BWF International Challenge tournament
  BWF International Series tournament

Note

References

External links
 
 

1995 births
Living people
Badminton players from Beijing
Chinese male badminton players
Badminton players at the 2020 Summer Olympics
Olympic badminton players of China
Olympic silver medalists for China
Olympic medalists in badminton
Medalists at the 2020 Summer Olympics
Badminton players at the 2018 Asian Games
Asian Games gold medalists for China
Asian Games bronze medalists for China
Asian Games medalists in badminton
Medalists at the 2018 Asian Games
World No. 1 badminton players